The U.S. state of Idaho is covered by two time zones, as described below. All locations observe daylight saving time.

The Pacific Time Zone (UTC−08:00, DST UTC−07:00) covers an area roughly coterminous with the Idaho Panhandle or North Idaho:
Benewah County
Bonner County
Boundary County
Clearwater County
Kootenai County (includes Coeur d'Alene)
Latah County (includes Moscow)
Lewis County
Nez Perce County (includes Lewiston)
Shoshone County
Portion of Idaho County north of the Salmon River
The towns of Burgdorf and Warren

An easy way to distinguish the line is that it essentially follows the line that divides Washington and Oregon. Idaho counties east of Washington observe Pacific Time, and Idaho counties east of Oregon observe Mountain Time.

The Mountain Time Zone (UTC−07:00, DST UTC−06:00) covers the rest of the state.

History
The 1918 Standard Time Act put most of Idaho into the Pacific Time Zone – only the very eastern parts were in the Mountain Time Zone.

For three decades or so in the middle of the twentieth century, Shoshone County had its own time arrangements; it was said to be "on permanent daylight time", so that in the winter the county had the same clock time as Montana and southern Idaho, but in the summer it had the same clock time as Spokane and northern Idaho.

tz database
The tz database version  contains two time zones for Idaho:

References

External links
 Time Zone Anomalies

Idaho
Geography of Idaho